Darlington Football Club is an English association football club founded in 1883 and based in the town of Darlington, County Durham. Its first team played in the Northern League from 1889 to 1908 and then in the North-Eastern League until becoming a member of the newly formed Football League Third Division North in 1921. They won that division's title in 1925, and their 15th place in the Second Division in 1926 remains their highest ever league finish, but most of their Football League history was spent in the bottom tier. The club lost its Football League status briefly in 1988 and again in 2010, since when the team has competed in non-league football.

The team's first success in a nationally organised cup competition came in the 1934 Third Division North Cup. They reached the last 16 of the FA Cup twice, and the quarter-final of the League Cup once, in 1968. In the early 1990s they won successive titles, in the Conference in 1990 and the Fourth Division in 1991. In 2011 they won the FA Trophy.

History

Darlington Football Club was founded in 1883 to address the local newspaper's view that there was "no club, urban or rural, sufficiently powerful to worthily represent" the town of Darlington. In their second season, the club's first team won the major regional trophy, the Durham Challenge Cup, and the following season they entered the FA Cup for the first time, only to lose 8–0 to Grimsby Town. In 1889, Darlington were one of the founder members of the Northern League; they won the league title in 1896 and 1900, and reached the semi-final of the FA Amateur Cup in the same two seasons. The club turned professional in 1908 and joined the North-Eastern League. The 1910–11 season saw Darlington reach the last 16 of the FA Cup, progressing through five qualifying rounds to lose to Swindon Town in the third round proper. They won the North-Eastern League in 1913 and 1921, and were invited to join the newly formed Football League Third Division North.

Runners-up in their first season in the Football League, Darlington were Third Division North champions three years later, thus winning promotion to the Second Division. Their 15th-place finish in 1926 remains, their best League performance; they were relegated back to the Third Division in 1927, where they remained until the Second World War put an end to competitive football. They came third in 1929–30, but twice had to apply for re-election to the League, in 1932–33 and 1936–37, after finishing in last place in the section. In 1934, they enjoyed their first success in a nationally organised cup competition, defeating Stockport County 4–3 at Old Trafford to win the Football League Third Division North Cup, and reached the final again two years later. In the 1957–58 season, the club equalled their previous best FA Cup run, reaching the last 16 by defeating Chelsea, Football League champions only three years earlier, in the fourth round. When the regional sections of the Third Division were merged in 1958–59 to form two national divisions, Darlington were placed in the fourth tier.

Darlington won promotion to the Third Division in 1965–66, but for one season only. Their most successful season in the League Cup came in 1967–68: drawn away to Brian Clough's Derby County in the quarter-final, they took the lead, only to lose 5–4. During the 1970s the club had to apply for re-election to the League five times. Darlington spent two seasons in the Third Division in the 1980s; their 13th-place finish in 1986 was a record high since the introduction of the four-division structure. Darlington were relegated from the Football League in 1988–89 after 68 years of continuous membership. They made an immediate return as Conference champions, then won the Fourth Division title in 1990–91, but spent only one season in the third tier before relegation followed.

Darlington lost in both the second and the third rounds of the 1999–2000 FA Cup. Manchester United's decision to play in the FIFA Club World Championship rather than the FA Cup left a space in the third round which the organisers filled by drawing lots from among the 20 teams eliminated in the second. Darlington were the "lucky losers", and were beaten 2–1 by Aston Villa in the third round after losing 3–1 to Gillingham in the second. They came close to a return to the Third Division via the play-offs in 1996 and 2000, and a period of administration in 2008–09 resulted in a 10-point deduction, without which they would again have reached the play-offs. The following season they were relegated to the Conference for the second time, and went on to reach the 2011 FA Trophy Final, in which Chris Senior scored the only goal of the game in the last minute of extra time to defeat Mansfield Town.

In 2011–12, another period of administration forced the termination of players' contracts before a last-minute injection of funding enabled Darlington to complete the season. The new owners' failure to secure a Company Voluntary Arrangement before exiting administration meant the Football Association treated the club as a new club, placed it in the Northern League, required a change of playing nameDarlington 1883 was chosenand barred it from entry to national competitions. The new club won the 2012–13 Northern League title by a 13-point margin to gain promotion to the Northern Premier League Division One North for 2013–14, followed two years later by consecutive promotions: first to the Premier Division via the play-offs, then to the National League North as 2015–16 Northern Premier League champions. They were unable to make it three in a row when, despite finishing in the playoff positions in 2016–17, ground grading issues prevented their participation.

The table details their achievements in senior first-team competitions from their first appearance in the FA Cup in 1885–86 to the end of the most recently completed season.

Key

Key to league record:
P – Played
W – Games won
D – Games drawn
L – Games lost
F – Goals for
A – Goals against
Pts – Points
Pos – Final position

Key to colours and symbols:

Key to divisions:
National N – National League North
Northern – Northern League
Northern 1 – Northern League Division 1
North East – North Eastern League
NPL – Northern Premier League
NPL 1N – Northern Premier League Division One North
Division 2 – Football League Second Division
Division 3 – Football League Third Division
Division 3N – Football League Third Division North
Division 4 – Football League Fourth Division
Conference – Conference National
League 2 – Football League Two

Prelim – Preliminary round
Group – Group stage
QR1 – First qualifying round
QR2 – Second qualifying round, etc.
R1 – Round 1, etc.
R1(N) – Round 1 Northern section, etc.
R1(NE) – Round 1 North-eastern section, etc.
QF – Quarter-final
QF(N) – Quarter-final Northern section
SF – Semi-final
SF(N) – Semi-final Northern section
F – Runners-up
W – Winners

Details of the abandoned 1939–40 Football League and 2020–21 National League North seasons are shown in italics and appropriately footnoted.

Seasons

Notes

References

External links
Darlington F.C. official website
Darlington F.C. former official website via archive.org

Seasons
 
Seasons
Darlington